Maihiihi is a rural community in the Ōtorohanga District and Waikato region of New Zealand's North Island.

Demographics
The SA1 area is part of the larger Maihiihi statistical area.

The SA1 area had a population of 219 at the 2018 New Zealand census, a decrease of 9 people (−3.9%) since the 2013 census, and a decrease of 24 people (−9.9%) since the 2006 census. There were 72 households, comprising 114 males and 108 females, giving a sex ratio of 1.06 males per female. The median age was 30.1 years (compared with 37.4 years nationally), with 63 people (28.8%) aged under 15 years, 45 (20.5%) aged 15 to 29, 99 (45.2%) aged 30 to 64, and 9 (4.1%) aged 65 or older.

Ethnicities were 87.7% European/Pākehā, 19.2% Māori, 5.5% Asian, and 2.7% other ethnicities. People may identify with more than one ethnicity.

Although some people chose not to answer the census's question about religious affiliation, 65.8% had no religion, 30.1% were Christian and 2.7% had other religions.

Of those at least 15 years old, 12 (7.7%) people had a bachelor's or higher degree, and 36 (23.1%) people had no formal qualifications. The median income was $45,000, compared with $31,800 nationally. 27 people (17.3%) earned over $70,000 compared to 17.2% nationally. The employment status of those at least 15 was that 105 (67.3%) people were employed full-time, 21 (13.5%) were part-time, and 3 (1.9%) were unemployed.

Maihiihi statistical area

Maihiihi had a population of 1,833 at the 2018 New Zealand census, a decrease of 15 people (−0.8%) since the 2013 census, and an increase of 54 people (3.0%) since the 2006 census. There were 657 households, comprising 963 males and 870 females, giving a sex ratio of 1.11 males per female. The median age was 33.3 years (compared with 37.4 years nationally), with 468 people (25.5%) aged under 15 years, 342 (18.7%) aged 15 to 29, 819 (44.7%) aged 30 to 64, and 207 (11.3%) aged 65 or older.

Ethnicities were 86.9% European/Pākehā, 21.3% Māori, 1.1% Pacific peoples, 3.9% Asian, and 1.3% other ethnicities. People may identify with more than one ethnicity.

The percentage of people born overseas was 11.1, compared with 27.1% nationally.

Although some people chose not to answer the census's question about religious affiliation, 57.3% had no religion, 31.4% were Christian, 0.3% had Māori religious beliefs, 1.0% were Hindu, 0.3% were Muslim, 0.3% were Buddhist and 2.0% had other religions.

Of those at least 15 years old, 147 (10.8%) people had a bachelor's or higher degree, and 315 (23.1%) people had no formal qualifications. The median income was $39,400, compared with $31,800 nationally. 222 people (16.3%) earned over $70,000 compared to 17.2% nationally. The employment status of those at least 15 was that 774 (56.7%) people were employed full-time, 234 (17.1%) were part-time, and 33 (2.4%) were unemployed.

Education

Maihiihi School is a Year 1-8 co-educational state primary school.

The school gained national attention in November 2016, for a handwritten note and parcel the principal gave an autistic student.

It has also opposed the use of seclusion rooms for autistic students.

References

Ōtorohanga District
Populated places in Waikato